Edison O. Jackson (born October 1, 1942) was the sixth president of Bethune-Cookman University.  Previously, he was president of Medgar Evers College from 1989 to 2009. 

In 2013, Jackson was appointed president of Bethune-Cookman University. He resigned amidst turmoil on July 11, 2017. 

Jackson was born in Heathsville, Virginia. Jackson received a Bachelor of Science degree in Zoology (1965), and a Master of Arts degree in Counseling from Howard University (1968), and a Doctorate in Education from Rutgers University (1983) with academic emphasis on the philosophy, function, role and administration of urban educational institutions.

Jackson is also a member of Phi Beta Sigma fraternity.

Notes and references

1942 births
Living people
Presidents of campuses of City University of New York
Howard University alumni
Rutgers University alumni
University of the District of Columbia faculty
Bethune–Cookman University people
People from Northumberland County, Virginia